Lovel Palmer (born 30 August 1984 in Mandeville) is a Jamaican footballer who currently plays as a defender and midfielder for the Des Moines Menace in the Premier Development League.

Career

Youth
Palmer began his career with the St. Elizabeth Technical High School football team in his native Jamaica, and in 1995 joined Essex Valley FC. In 1998, with Essex Valley, Palmer participated in an international youth tournament in Norway He also played in several youth teams for Essex Valley before joining the youth system of Harbour View in January 1999.

Club
Palmer won Premier League and Caribbean Club Championship titles in 1995 and 2004 with Harbour View, before joining TT Pro League team W Connection on loan.  While at Harbour View, Palmer also had an unsuccessful trial with IK Start in Norway in February 2009.

During the 2004 season he appeared in eleven games and scored two goals for W Connection before returning to Harbour View in December 2004. Palmer soon became the leader and captain of Harbour View, and he led the team to victory in the Jamaica National Premier League in 2007/2008.

On 19 March 2010, Palmer and Harbour View completed a deal that sent Palmer to Houston Dynamo in Major League Soccer. The terms of the transfer were undisclosed.

On 21 July 2011, Palmer was traded to Portland Timbers along with Mike Chabala and an international roster spot in exchange for Adam Moffat and allocation money.

Palmer's option was declined by Portland on 3 December 2012. He elected to enter the 2012 MLS Re-Entry Draft and was selected by Real Salt Lake in stage two of the draft on 14 December 2012. He missed a penalty in a shootout during the 2013 MLS Cup that gave Sporting Kansas City the league title. Six days later he was traded by RSL to Chicago Fire in exchange for allocation money.

After two years in Chicago, Palmer signed with Indy Eleven of the North American Soccer League on 12 January 2016.

Palmer signed with NASL side Miami FC on 14 August 2017 following his release from Indy Eleven.

Palmer signed with USL PDL side Des Moines Menace in June 2018 following his departure from Miami FC. He left the club at the end of the season. 

In June of 2021, Palmer returned to professional football in the Jamaican Premier League with Harbour View.

International
Palmer played for the Jamaican U-17, U-20 and U-23 national teams, and has been a member of the Jamaica national football team since 2005.

Career statistics

Club

International

Statistics accurate as of match played 12 December 2012

Personal
Palmer holds a U.S. green card which qualifies him as a domestic player for MLS roster purposes.

Honors

Club
Harbour View
Jamaica National Premier League (3): 2000, 2007, 2010
JFF Champions Cup (2): 2001, 2002
CFU Club Championship (2): 2004, 2007

Real Salt Lake
Major League Soccer Western Conference Championship (1): 2013

Indy Eleven
North American Soccer League Spring Season (1): 2016

 Des Moines Menace
USL League Two Regular Season Championship (1): 2018

International
Jamaica
Caribbean Cup (1): 2010

References

External links

1984 births
Living people
People from Mandeville, Jamaica
Jamaican footballers
Jamaica international footballers
Jamaican expatriate footballers
Expatriate footballers in Trinidad and Tobago
Expatriate soccer players in the United States
Harbour View F.C. players
W Connection F.C. players
Houston Dynamo FC players
Portland Timbers players
Real Salt Lake players
Chicago Fire FC players
Indy Eleven players
Miami FC players
Jamaican expatriate sportspeople in Trinidad and Tobago
Jamaican expatriate sportspeople in the United States
2005 CONCACAF Gold Cup players
TT Pro League players
Major League Soccer players
North American Soccer League players
Association football defenders
Association football midfielders